The 2016–17 Biathlon World Cup – World Cup 8 was held from 9 March until 12 March 2017. Initially it was planned to be held in Tyumen, Russia, but IBU cancelled the host rights for Russia. On 7 January 2017, IBU announced that Stage 8 will be held in Kontiolahti, Finland.

Schedule of events

Medal winners

Men

Women

Mixed

Achievements

 Best performance for all time

 , 12th place in Sprint
 , 7th place in Sprint 
 , 14th place in Sprint

 First World Cup race

References 

2016–17 Biathlon World Cup
2017 in Finnish sport
Kontiolahti
Biathlon World Cup
Biathlon competitions in Finland